Sar Deh is a village in Takht-e Jolgeh Rural District, in the Central District of Firuzeh County, Razavi Khorasan Province, Iran. At the 2006 census, its population was 671, in 177 families.

References 

Populated places in Firuzeh County